A. gigas  may refer to:

Plants
Amorphophallus gigas, a species of the genus Amorphophallus

Animals
Acerentulus gigas
Aethilla gigas, provisionally accepted name; see Aethilla (butterfly)
Agdistis gigas, provisionally accepted name for a moth species (Agdistis manicata)
Agylla gigas, provisionally accepted name
Alveopora gigas, see IUCN Red List vulnerable species (Animalia)
Anopheles gigas
Apagomerina gigas
Arapaima gigas, arapaima, pirarucu, or paiche, a freshwater fish
Archispirostreptus gigas (synonym), the giant African millipede
Argyropelecus gigas, giant hatchetfish or greater silver hatchetfish
Arius gigas
Athletes gigas, provisionally accepted name; see Athletes (moth)
Avelia gigas, a karyorelict ciliate in genus Avelia
Ancyloscelis gigas, a Southern Brazilian bee

See also
 Gigas (disambiguation)